Calotes manamendrai (Manamendra-Arachchi's whistling lizard) is an agamid lizard endemic to Sri Lanka. Locally known as මනමේන්ද්‍ර-ආරච්චිගේ උරුවන් කටුස්සා (Manamendra-Arachchigë Uruwan Katussa).

Etymology
The specific name is as an honor to the herpetologist and taxonomist Kelum Manamendra-Arachchi for his remarkable contributions to the biodiversity and zooarchaeology of Sri Lanka for more than three decades.

Description
Female with non enlarged pectoral scales. Dorsal scales keeled. Midgular scales smaller than the rest of the throat scales. Seven distinct stripes found on each side on gular area. Shoulder pit blackish.

References

manamendrai
Reptiles of Sri Lanka
Endemic fauna of Sri Lanka
Reptiles described in 2014